BBTV may refer to:
BroadbandTV Corp
Banana bunchy top virus